Reginald Francis "Rex" Ritchie (24 December 1914 – 1 April 2006) was an Australian rules footballer who played with South Melbourne in the VFL. Ritchie was a defender and won the South Melbourne Best and Fairest award in 1941.

Ritchie's time at South Melbourne was interrupted by his service in the Australian Army during World War II.

References

External links

1914 births
2006 deaths
Australian rules footballers from Melbourne
Sydney Swans players
Preston Football Club (VFA) players
Bob Skilton Medal winners
People from Croydon, Victoria
Australian Army personnel of World War II
Military personnel from Melbourne